First Baptist Church is a Baptist church located in Memphis, Tennessee.  It was established in 1839. The church has been considered influential amongst moderate Baptists throughout the southern United States since its founding.

History

The First Baptist Church of Memphis was organized in April 1839.  First Baptist was organized with eleven charter members, meeting in an old log schoolhouse in Downtown Memphis. Its 1907 neo-classical church building designed by R. H. Hunt was completed in 1907. In December 1951, famed Baptist Statesman Rev. Dr. R. Paul Caudill moved the church from the corner of Linden and Lauderdale in the southern portion of Downtown Memphis, to a new location on the edge of Midtown Memphis at 200 East Parkway North. The former building became the home of Mt. Olive Cathedral Christian Methodist Episcopal Church.

Music

The church has had a rich history of traditional music.  Musical instruments include its 1951 Wicks pipe organ, located in its sanctuary, and its 1958 M.P. Möeller pipe organ, located in the Caudill Chapel.  Rev. Ray Hatton (recently retired) has been the minister of music since 1986 and Dr. Michelle Dixon-Cronk, D.M.A. has been the organist since 1990.  Music director Earl Holloway preceded Rev. Hatton, and organist Lamar King preceded Dr. Cronk.

Senior pastors

Rev. Dr. R. Paul Caudill 1944-1976
Rev. Dr. Earl C. Davis 1976-1994
Rev. Dr. Kenneth C. Corr 1996-2007
Rev. Dr. David Breckenridge 2008–2018

Notable clergy

Rev. Dr. Carol McCall-Richardson
Rev. Phimphone Phetvixay

Controversies

During the early 1970s, the church voted to allow an African American family to join, being the first Southern Baptist Church in Memphis to do so.

During the early 1990s, the church began ordaining women to the diaconate.

During July 1994, Rev. Dr. Earl C. Davis led approximately half of the church membership to plant Trinity Baptist Church, in Cordova.

During 2001, the church ordained a lifelong member of the church, Rev. Dr. Carol McCall-Richardson to the pastorate. She served as the church's associate pastor until her retirement in 2012.

References

External links
 

Churches in Memphis, Tennessee
Baptist churches in Tennessee
Southern Baptist Convention churches
Religious organizations established in 1839
1839 establishments in Tennessee